Onufri Argitis or Onoufrios of Neokastro or Onoufrios Argytes was a 16th century painter of Orthodox icons and Archpriest of Elbasan, active in the 16th century in modern-day southern Albania and in the south-western region of Macedonia (modern-day Kastoria, Macedonia, Greece). His works are characterized by post-Byzantine and Venetian influences. He also painted portraits, landscapes, and churches.

Life
Little is known with certainty about Onufri's life and his existence only emerged in the early 20th century. Regarding his birthplace only an inscription in the Holy Apostles church, near Kastoria has survived. Onufri is believed to have been born in the early 16th century either in the region of Berat (in today's Albania) or near Kastoria or Grevena (in today's northern Greece). The epithet Argitis, which appears in a fresco near Kastoria may point to Argos as his place of birth, although as he used it only once it is regarded probable that it refers to a location in the area of Kastoria. His flawless Greek calligraphic inscriptions is an indicator that he received high-level education. He was educated in the Republic of Venice and was a member of the Greek Brotherhood of Venice.

In the climate of the time, the painting of Christian icons can be seen as an act to restore pre-Ottoman culture. He was active in Berat and possibly Venice until 1547. Then he worked in both Berat and Kastoria and in 1555, in Shelcan near Elbasan. He may have also been the painter of various murals in the church of St. Nicholas near Prilep (North Macedonia). After 1554, he lived and painted in the village of Valsh. In a number of churches his works were signed with the title "Protopapas", demonstrating a senior position in the church hierarchy. However, his signature has not been preserved on icons that have been also attributed to him such as a Dodekaorton icon at that is preserved at the National Museum of Medieval Art in Korce.

Work
Onufri introduced greater realism and individuality into facial expressions, breaking with the strict conventions of the time. He was the first to introduce the colour pink into icon painting. The secret of this colour was not passed on and died with him. His work is noted for the intense use of colours and the use of natural dyes. 
According to Georgios Golobias the works of Onufri were significantly influenced by western art, as a result of his possible stay in Venice, being a member of the local Greek fraternity. On the other hand, Manolis Chatzidakis claims that western traces are few and they can be explained due to the contact with the paintings of the Cretan School.

Onufri founded a school of painting in Berat, which was passed on to his son Nikolla, and upon his death to Onouphrios Cypriotes (Onufri Cypriota) and Kostandin Shpataraku.

Gallery

External links
 Official Website of the Onufri National Museum
 Icon Museum

References

16th-century Albanian people
16th-century Greek people
Greek icon painters
Albanian clergy
Greek clergy
Eastern Orthodox icons
Members of the Ecumenical Patriarchate of Constantinople
Venetian Albanians
Venetian Greeks
People from Elbasan
16th-century Greek painters